Elevator music (also known as Muzak, piped music, or lift music) is a type of background music played in rooms where many people come together (that is, with no intention whatsoever to listen to music), and during telephone calls when placed on hold. There is a specific sound associated with elevator music, but it usually involves simple instrumental themes from "soft" popular music, or "light" classical music being performed by slow strings. This type of music was produced, for instance, by the Mantovani Orchestra, and conductors such as Franck Pourcel and James Last, peaking in popularity around the 1970s.

More recent types of elevator music may be computer-generated, with the actual score being composed entirely algorithmically.

Other uses  
The term can also be used for kinds of easy listening, piano solo, jazz or middle of the road music, or what are known as "beautiful music" radio stations.

This style of music is sometimes used to comedic effect in mass media such as film, where intense or dramatic scenes may be interrupted or interspersed with such anodyne music while characters use an elevator. Some video games have used music similarly: Metal Gear Solid 4 where a few elevator music-themed tracks are accessible on the in-game iPod, as well as Rise of the Triad: Dark War, GoldenEye 007, Mass Effect, and Earthworm Jim.

Opposition
There are a number of societies, such as Pipedown, that are dedicated to reducing the extent and intrusiveness of piped music.  This campaign group proposes that some people can be deeply annoyed by piped music, and even find it spoils their enjoyment in recreation or drives them out of shops.  They suggest that eight out of 10 people have left an establishment early because it was too noisy.   The Good Pub Guide 2017 called for a ban on piped music in pubs, already the case in houses managed by the Samuel Smith Brewery.

References

Elevators
Easy listening music
Industrial music services